Tea Kadai Raja (Tamil: டீ கடை ராஜா) is a 2016 Indian Tamil romantic film written and directed by newcomer Raja Subbiah. The title was inspired from the hit song "Tea Kada Raja" from the 2014 film Velaiyilla Pattathari. A 'Funtoon Talkies' production, the film stars Raja Subbiah, Neha Gayatri, Yogi Babu, Sharmila Thapa, and Madhan Bob, and was released on 8 April 2016 by Sri Thenandal Films. The title Tea Kadai Raja signifies the ordinary boys who are next door.

Plot 
The story centers around boys who live next door to each other and revolves around a love affair of one of the boys in his semi urban backdrop.

Cast 
Raja Subbiah as Saravana
Neha Gayatri as Sona
Yogi Babu as Saravana's friend
Sharmila Thapa as Teacher
Madhan Bob

Production
For Dhanush, Samantha and Amy Jackson starrer Thanga Magan, original title considered was Tea Kadai Raja. Tea Kadai Raja then became the chosen title of debut venture of Funtoon Talkies.  Writer/director Marudhu Raja  states "Some of the incidents that happened in my life are what inspired me to make this film. Everybody will be able to relate to this film," says Raja, who relates that "all of us are beautiful in one way or the other".

Soundtrack 

Dhanraj Manickam's soundtrack consists of nine tracks including one instrumental theme and one Gana song sung by Gana Bala.

Release
The film was released on 8 April 2016 by Sri Thenandal Films. The Satellite TV Rights and YouTube Rights were grabbed by Raj TV.

Reception

The movie was rated with 3.5/5 by nettv4u.

References

External links
 

Indian romantic drama films
2016 films
2016 romantic drama films
2010s Tamil-language films